Lucas is an unincorporated community in  Barren County, Kentucky, United States. Its post office closed in May 1996.

References

Unincorporated communities in Barren County, Kentucky
Unincorporated communities in Kentucky